Pronina is a rural locality (a village) in Yorgvinskoye Rural Settlement, Kudymkarsky District, Perm Krai, Russia. The population was 15 as of 2010.

Geography 
It is located 19 km north from Kudymkar.

References 

Rural localities in Kudymkarsky District